Eschbach is a river of Hesse, Germany. It is a tributary of the Nidda near Bad Vilbel. From the confluence of its source rivers Dornbach and Heuchelbach to its outflow into the Nidda, is 8.1 km long.

See also
List of rivers of Hesse

References

Rivers of Hesse
Rivers of the Taunus
Rivers of Germany